G Train could refer to:
The G (New York City Subway service)
The G scale for model railroads
The nickname of former  Australian rules footballer, Fraser Gehrig
The nickname of  Australian rules footballer, Caitlin Greiser